Saint-Vaast-la-Hougue is a commune in the Manche department in Normandy in north-western France.

Toponymy
Saint-Vaast is the Norman name of Saint Vedast and Hougue is a Norman language word meaning a "mound" or "loaf" and comes from the Old Norse word haugr.

Geography

Saint-Vaast-la-Hougue is part of the canton of Val-de-Saire and the arrondissement of Cherbourg. The town had a population of 1,712 in 2019. The island of Tatihou forms part of the Saint-Vaast-la-Hougue commune.

History

Saint-Vaast-la-Hougue is located in Normandy and was a part of the Duchy of Normandy.

In 1001, near Saint-Vaast-la-Hougue, Néel I de Saint-Saveur (related with Saint-Sauveur-le-Vicomte in the Cotentin Peninsula) (occasionally named Nigel or Niel), a Norman baron of the House of Saint-Sauveur (fr), repulsed an Anglo-Saxon incursion led by King Æthelred II; a pillaging raid in reprisal for the Viking expeditions into the Anglo-Saxon kingdom. The raid failed thanks to the effort of Neel, who exterminated the invaders at the Battle of Val-de-Saire.

When Edward III landed 12,000 men in France on 12 July 1346 and proceeded toward what would become the battle of Crécy, it was on the sandy stretch that lies between La Hougue and St Vaast.

The naval Battle of La Hougue took place off the town in 1692. On 3 June 1692 during a heated battle with the Anglo-Dutch fleet, twelve French ships were sunk in the vicinity of the island of Tatihou, just off the coast of Saint-Vaast-la-Hougue. It was the decisive naval battle of the Nine Years' War, also known as the War of the English Succession.

Following the French defeat, two fortified towers were built from 1694 onwards on the mound at La Hougue and Tatihou Island by a student of Vauban, Benjamin de Combes, in order to defend the bay. The towers were inscribed on the UNESCO World Heritage List in 2008 as part of the Fortifications of Vauban site for their testimony to Vauban's work and its importance in the development of military architecture from the 17th through the 19th centuries.

A French frigate squadron anchored at Saint-Vaast-la-Hougue was attacked by a British squadron at the action of 15 November 1810, which ultimately led to the destruction of the French ship French frigate Elisa.

The harbor was developed during the course of the 19th century. The jetty was built between 1828 and 1845, followed by the quayside from 1846 to 1852. Later on, breakwaters were added around the harbor. In 1982, the port was closed off with two large hydraulic gates which keep the water level constant at low tide. This allowed the construction of a large marina which can accommodate 704 yachts, including 100 moorings for visitors. Nowadays, the post is shared by fishing boats and yachts.

Saint-Vaast-la-Hougue was the first harbor to be freed by Allied Forces during World War II, in 1944.

A medieval whaling economy
Saint-Vaast-la-Hougue was a very active whaling center, as there was a dense population of the then common gray whale (which is now extinct in the Atlantic). The now rare right whale was likely also taken. The first of what may prove to be many more gray whales found its way through the now ice-free Northwest Passage in 2010 so perhaps they will eventually breed off Saint-Vaast-la-Hougue once more.

Culture
Saint-Vaast-la-Hougue organize a regular Book Festival, "Ancres & Encres". Jean Raspail and Jean-Pierre Thiollet may be mentioned among the authors invited in the last ten years.

Twin towns
Bridport in the United Kingdom

See also
Communes of the Manche department

References

External links

Office de Tourisme de Saint-Vaast la Hougue / Réville
The Shipwreck of The Battle Of La Hougue (1692)
The Vikings in Normandy

Saintvaastlahougue
Vauban fortifications in France
Populated coastal places in France